In mathematics, Helly's selection theorem (also called the Helly selection principle) states that a uniformly bounded sequence of monotone real functions admits a convergent subsequence.
In other words, it is a sequential compactness theorem for the space of uniformly bounded monotone functions.
It is named for the Austrian mathematician Eduard Helly.
A more general version of the theorem asserts compactness of the space BVloc of functions locally of bounded total variation that are uniformly bounded at a point.

The theorem has applications throughout mathematical analysis. In probability theory, the result implies compactness of a tight family of measures.

Statement of the theorem

Let (fn)n ∈ N be a sequence of increasing functions mapping the real line R into itself,
and suppose that it is uniformly bounded: there are a,b ∈ R such that a ≤ fn ≤ b for every n  ∈  N.
Then the sequence (fn)n ∈ N admits a pointwise convergent subsequence.

Generalisation to BVloc

Let U be an open subset of the real line and let fn : U → R, n ∈ N, be a sequence of functions. Suppose that
 (fn) has uniformly bounded total variation on any W that is compactly embedded in U. That is, for all sets W ⊆ U with compact closure W̄ ⊆ U,

where the derivative is taken in the sense of tempered distributions;
 and (fn) is uniformly bounded at a point. That is, for some t ∈ U, { fn(t) | n ∈ N } ⊆ R is a bounded set.

Then there exists a subsequence fnk, k ∈ N, of fn and a function f : U → R, locally of bounded variation, such that
 fnk converges to f pointwise;
 and fnk converges to f locally in L1 (see locally integrable function), i.e., for all W compactly embedded in U,

 and, for W compactly embedded in U,

Further generalizations
There are many generalizations and refinements of Helly's theorem.  The following theorem, for BV functions taking values in Banach spaces, is due to Barbu and Precupanu:

Let X be a reflexive, separable Hilbert space and let E be a closed, convex subset of X.  Let Δ : X → [0, +∞) be positive-definite and homogeneous of degree one.  Suppose that zn is a uniformly bounded sequence in BV([0, T]; X) with zn(t) ∈ E for all n ∈ N and t ∈ [0, T].  Then there exists a subsequence znk and functions δ, z ∈ BV([0, T]; X) such that
 for all t ∈ [0, T],

 and, for all t ∈ [0, T],

 and, for all 0 ≤ s < t ≤ T,

See also 

 Bounded variation
 Fraňková-Helly selection theorem
 Total variation

References

 

  

Compactness theorems
Theorems in analysis